Angeles Mesa Branch Library is a branch library of the Los Angeles Public Library in the Angeles Mesa neighborhood of Los Angeles. It was built in the late 1920s based on a Spanish Colonial Revival style design by architect Royal Dana. The building was dedicated and opened to the public on October 9, 1928, and cost about $35,000 to build and furnish.

In 1987, the Angeles Mesa Branch and several other branch libraries in Los Angeles were added to the National Register of Historic Places as part of a thematic group submission.   The application noted that the branch libraries had been constructed in a variety of period revival styles to house the initial branch library system of the City of Los Angeles.

See also

List of Registered Historic Places in Los Angeles
Los Angeles Public Library

References

External links
 Angeles Mesa Branch - Los Angeles Public Library
 Brief history of the Angeles Mesa Branch Library
 Typewritten history of Angeles Mesa Branch Library from 1936 to 1949, written by staff
 Information concerning the construction of Angeles Mesa Branch Library--facts and figures
 Program for the re-dedication of the renovated Angeles Mesa Branch Library, with its history in English and Spanish
 Newspaper article, "Local library starts with deposit of 150 books", Angeles Mesa News, June 25, 1937

Library buildings completed in 1929
Libraries in Los Angeles
Libraries on the National Register of Historic Places in Los Angeles
Spanish Colonial Revival architecture in California
Crenshaw, Los Angeles